Bayrak (Bayraq) is a rural locality (a village) in Tuzlukushevsky Selsoviet, Belebeyevsky District, Bashkortostan, Russia. The population was 12 as of 2010. There is 1 street.

Geography 
Bayrak is located 20 km north of Belebey (the district's administrative centre) by road. Tuzlukush is the nearest rural locality.

References 

Rural localities in Belebeyevsky District